The Scarab Ring is a 1921 American silent mystery film directed by Edward José and starring Alice Joyce, Maude Malcolm and Joe King.

Cast
 Alice Joyce as Constance Randall
 Maude Malcolm as Muriel Randall
 Joe King as Ward Locke
 Eddie Phillips as Burton Temple 
 Fuller Mellish as John Randall
 Claude King as Hugh Martinn
 Joseph W. Smiley as James Locke 
 Jack Hopkins as Mr. Kheres
 Armand Cortes as Kennedy

References

Bibliography
Ken Wlaschin. Silent Mystery and Detective Movies: A Comprehensive Filmography. McFarland, 2009.

External links
 

1921 films
1921 mystery films
American silent feature films
American mystery films
American black-and-white films
Films directed by Edward José
Vitagraph Studios films
1920s English-language films
1920s American films
Silent mystery films